Hanskunda is a census town in Goalpokhar I CD Block in Islampur subdivision of Uttar Dinajpur district in the state of West Bengal, India.

Geography

Location
Hanskunda is located at 
Hanskunda is not marked in Google maps. It is shown in the District Census Handbook.

In the map alongside, all places marked on the map are linked in the full screen version.

Demographics
As per the 2011 Census of India, Hanskunda had a total population of 5,939, of which 3,065 (52%) were males and 2,874 (48%) were females. Population below 6 years was 975. The total number of literates in Hanskunda was 3,219 (64.85% of the population over 6 years).

Official languages
As per the West Bengal Official Language (Amendment) Act, 2012, which came into force from December 2012, Urdu was given the status of official language in areas, such as subdivisions and blocks, having more than 10% Urdu speaking population. In Uttar Dinajpur district, Goalpokhar I and II blocks, Islampur block and Islampur municipality were identified as fulfilling the norms set In 2014, Calcutta High Court, in an order, included Dalkhola municipality in the list.

Transport
National Highway 27 passes through Hanskunda and Panjipara railway station is located nearby.

References

Cities and towns in Uttar Dinajpur district